Mojave is an album by alternative rock band Concrete Blonde. It was their final album.

Track listing

References

Concrete Blonde albums
2004 albums